Ernest T. Poulos (February 18, 1926 – March 30, 1997) was an American Thoroughbred horse trainer. A native of Chicago, he conditioned horses at local tracks beginning in 1952 but gained national attention when he took over the training of Black Tie Affair in 1989. Poulos guided the three-year-old colt through three highly successful years, capped off in 1991 with a win in the Breeders' Cup Classic and United States Horse of the Year honors.

Poulos served with the United States Merchant Marine and on June 6, 1944, he was on a ship that took part in the Normandy landings on D.Day.

Such was the admiration for Ernie Poulos in Chicago that when he died in 1997, his funeral was held at the Arlington Park race track. For his significant contribution to the Thoroughbred racing industry, in 2000 he was the posthumous recipient of the Governor's Award from the Racing Industry Charitable Foundation (RICF).

References

 Copy of December 5, 1997 Chicago Sun-Times article
 June 13, 2000 Thoroughbred Times.com article titled Poulos, state champs, to be honored in Illinois

1926 births
1997 deaths
American horse trainers
United States Merchant Mariners
United States Merchant Mariners of World War II
American people of Greek descent
People from Chicago